Holy See–Lebanon relations are foreign relations between the Holy See and Lebanon.  Both countries established diplomatic relations in 1947. The Holy See has a nunciature in Harissa. Lebanon has an embassy in Rome.

The Holy See has played a major role in the peace negotiations of Lebanon. It has sought to unify Christian factions that were separated after the Lebanese Civil War. At the same time, it sought to reduce Christian-Muslim tensions and to preserve Christian communities that have been declining in many parts of Lebanon and elsewhere in the Middle East.

Cardinal Nasrallah Sfeir, a close friend of the Pope, has had a significant influence in local Lebanese politics. John Paul II was widely regarded as a political ally of Lebanon, which he called the message-country.

In April 2021, prime minister-designate Saad al-Hariri visited the Holy See and met with Pope Francis, who promised to visit Lebanon, after political differences were set aside. Francis reiterated his support for the country and urged the international community to help Lebanon "to get back on its feet."

See also 
 Foreign relations of the Holy See
 Foreign relations of Lebanon

References

External links
Lebanon (nunciature)
Pope John Paul II's visit

 

 
L
Bilateral relations of Lebanon
Catholicism and Islam
Catholic Church in Lebanon